Greek referendum may refer to:

1862 Greek head of state referendum, on adopting Prince Alfred of the United Kingdom as king (approved)
1920 Greek referendum, on the return of King Constantine I (approved)
1924 Greek republic referendum, on becoming a republic (approved)
1935 Greek monarchy referendum, on restoring the monarchy (approved)
1946 Greek referendum, on maintaining the monarchy (approved)
1968 Greek constitutional referendum, on a new constitution following the military coup (approved)
1973 Greek republic referendum, on becoming a republic (approved)
1974 Greek republic referendum, on maintaining the republic (approved)
2011 Greek proposed economy referendum, on 'haircut' for creditors (referendum did not take place)
2015 Greek bailout referendum, on conditions required by IMF etc. for bailout (rejected)